Mikhail Zakharovich Levitin (born December 27, 1945, Odessa) is a Soviet and Russian theater director, writer, educator, People's Artist of Russia, art director of . Twice winner of the Moscow Prize in Literature

In 1969 he graduated from the directing faculty of GITIS (course of Yuri Zavadsky).

In 1987, Mikhail Levitin took the post of chief director of the Theater of Miniatures. In the same year the theater was renamed the Hermitage Theater. In 1990, he became its artistic director.

At the same time, Mikhail Levitin made his debut as a prose writer. Currently, he is a member of the Writers' Union of Russia, a member of the Russian PEN International.

In 1991, Mikhail Levitin was awarded the honorary title of Honored Artist of the RSFSR, and in 2001 People's Artist of Russia. In 2006 he was awarded the Order of Honor.

Was married to actress Olga Ostroumova, two children from this marriage. Currently married to Maria Kondrashova, daughter of this marriage.

References

External links
 Михаил Левитин на сайте театра «Эрмитаж»

1945 births
Living people
Theatre people from Odesa
Russian theatre directors
Recipients of the Order of Honour (Russia)
Russian Academy of Theatre Arts alumni
20th-century Russian writers
21st-century Russian writers
People's Artists of Russia
Soviet theatre directors